Winsford Urban District was an urban district in Cheshire, England, based in the town of Winsford. It was created in 1894 and abolished in 1974 when it was absorbed into the Vale Royal district, itself abolished in 2009.

References

External links
 Winsford UD archives at The National Archives
 

Districts of England created by the Local Government Act 1894
Districts of England abolished by the Local Government Act 1972
History of Cheshire
Urban districts of England
Former districts of Cheshire
Winsford